Ouvéa or Uvea is a commune in the Loyalty Islands Province of New Caledonia, an overseas territory of France in the Pacific Ocean. The settlement of Fayaoué , on Ouvéa Island, is the administrative centre of the commune.

Geography
Ouvéa is made up of Ouvéa Island, the smaller Mouli Island and Faiava Island, and several islets around these three. All lie among the Loyalty Islands, to the northeast of New Caledonia's mainland.

Important Bird Area
Ouvea has been recognised as an Important Bird Area (IBA) by BirdLife International because it supports populations of red-bellied fruit doves, Ouvea parakeets, grey-eared honeyeaters, New Caledonian friarbirds, cardinal myzomelas, fan-tailed gerygones, long-tailed trillers, streaked fantails, Melanesian flycatchers and striated starlings.

Climate
Ouvéa has a tropical monsoon climate (Köppen climate classification Am).

History
Ouvéa is a Polynesian outlier originally settled by Polynesian navigators who named it for their home island, Uvea Island. Some of their descendants still speak the West Uvean language.

Kanak activism

In April 1988, a hostage taking took place on Ouvéa. Four gendarmes were killed and twenty-seven were held hostage in a cave by supporters of the Kanak and Socialist National Liberation Front. Twelve of the captured gendarmes were released after a while, but six members of a French anti-terrorist squad were also taken hostage. When negotiations to release the hostages did not succeed, French security forces besieged the cave and freed them. Eighteen Kanaks and two gendarmes were left dead. In the aftermath it was alleged that three Kanaks had been executed or left to die after being arrested.

Languages
The native languages of Ouvéa are the Melanesian Iaai and the Polynesian Faga Uvea, which is the only Polynesian language that has taken root in New Caledonia. Speakers of Faga Uvea have fully integrated into the Kanak society and consider themselves Kanak.

References

Communes of New Caledonia
Polynesian outliers
Loyalty Islands
Important Bird Areas of New Caledonia